Roosevelt School may refer to:

 Roosevelt School (Yuma, Arizona), listed on the National Register of Historic Places (NRHP) in Yuma County, Arizona
 Roosevelt School (Lake Wales, Florida), NRHP-listed
 Roosevelt School (Boise, Idaho), NRHP-listed
 Roosevelt School (Coeur d'Alene, Idaho), listed on the NRHP in Kootenai County, Idaho
 Roosevelt School (Ames, Iowa), NRHP-listed
 Roosevelt School (Hamlin, Maine), NRHP-listed
 Roosevelt School (St. John, Maine), built in 1920, NRHP-listed
 Roosevelt School (Bernalillo, New Mexico), listed on the NRHP in Sandoval County, New Mexico
 Roosevelt School (Casper, Wyoming), built in 1922, NRHP-listed

See also
 Roosevelt (disambiguation)
 Roosevelt Elementary School (disambiguation)
 Roosevelt Junior High School (disambiguation)
 Roosevelt Middle School (disambiguation)
 Roosevelt High School (disambiguation)
 Roosevelt School District (disambiguation)
 Roosevelt Intermediate School